A hiccup is an involuntary contraction of the diaphragm.

Hiccup can also refer to:

 Hiccup (film), official title Hichki, a 2018 Indian film directed by Sidharth Malhotra
 Hiccups (TV series), the Canadian 2010–2011 television comedy
 "Hiccup", a song by Pink from her 2000 album Can't Take Me Home
 Hiccup Horrendous Haddock III, the main protagonist of the How to Train Your Dragon franchise
 Mr. Hiccup, an Italian animated series